Steve Greatwood (born August 15, 1958 in Eugene, Oregon) is a retired American football coach.

Career
Greatwood has over 30 years of coaching experience, including stints in the NFL (St. Louis Rams) and at four different colleges (Oregon, USC, Maryland, California). Widely regarded as one of the premiere offensive line coaches in college football today, Greatwood was named the National Offensive Line Coach of the Year by the American Football Coaches Association in 2008.

The former Churchill High School standout completed his playing career at Oregon with an appearance in the 1980 Hula Bowl and was the recipient of the Bob Officer Award, given to the Oregon player who makes a major contribution to the success of the program despite physical adversity. Greatwood later signed as a free agent with the San Francisco 49ers before initiating his coaching career as the Ducks’ defensive graduate assistant for two years.

References

External links
GoDucks.com Biography - Steve Greatwood

1958 births
Living people
Sportspeople from Eugene, Oregon
Oregon Ducks football players
Oregon Ducks football coaches
St. Louis Rams coaches
Maryland Terrapins football coaches
USC Trojans football coaches
California Golden Bears football coaches
Winston Churchill High School (Eugene, Oregon) alumni